The 2011 Avispa Fukuoka season was Avispa Fukuoka's first season in J. League Division 1 since 2006, and 8th overall in the top division. It also includes the 2011 J. League Cup, and the 2011 Emperor's Cup. Avispa Fukuoka finished the J. League season in 17th place and were relegated to the 2012 J. League Division 2.

Players

Competitions

J. League

Final standing

Results summary

Results by round

J. League Cup

Emperor's Cup

References

Avispa Fukuoka
Avispa Fukuoka seasons